The huon small-toothed moss mouse (Pseudohydromys carlae) is a species of mouse belonging to the family Muridae that is endemic to Papua New Guinea.

References

carlae
Mammals described in 2009
Mammals of Papua New Guinea
Endemic fauna of Papua New Guinea
Rodents of New Guinea